Baraka or Barakah may refer to:

 Berakhah or Baraka, in Judaism, a blessing usually recited during a ceremony
 Barakah or Baraka, in Islam, the beneficent force from God that flows through the physical and spiritual spheres
 Baraka, full ḥabbat al-barakah, a.k.a. Nigella sativa, a spice with purported health benefits

Places
 Baraka, Democratic Republic of the Congo, a town in the eastern Congolese province of Sud-Kivu on Lake Tanganyika.
 Baraka, Gabon, a site where American missionaries from New England established a mission in 1842 on what is now Libreville
 Baraka School, an educational program in Kenya, featured in the film The Boys of Baraka
 Baraka, the local nickname for Barakaldo, Spain
 Baraka River, Eritrea and Sudan
 Har Brakha, an Israeli settlement in the West Bank, Palestinian territories
 Barakeh, Hama, Syria

People
 Ajamu Baraka (born 1953), human rights activist and 2016 candidate for Vice President of the United States
 Amiri Baraka (1934–2014), American writer
 Ras J. Baraka (born 1970), American politician and current mayor of Newark, New Jersey
 Al-Said Barakah (1260–1280), Mamluk Sultan
 Barack Obama, Sr. (1934–1982), born Baraka Obama, Kenyan father of U.S. President Barack Obama
 Baraka bint Thaʿlaba, known as Umm Ayman, female companion of Muhammad

Media
 Baraka (film), a 1992 experimental documentary film by Ron Fricke
 Baraka (novel), a 1983 novel by John Ralston Saul
 Baraka (Mortal Kombat), a fictional character in the Mortal Kombat series
 Baraka (album), a 1997 album by DKV Trio
 Barakah (album), a 2016 album by Sami Yusuf

Other
 Al-Barakah (ISIL administrative district), a self-proclaimed district and former province
, an ethno-jazz collective, from Riga, Latvia
 Barakah nuclear power plant, in the United Arab Emirates
 barakaši, a name the party founders of the Croatian Democratic Union gave to themselves

See also 
 Barack (disambiguation)
 Barak (disambiguation)